Bush School may refer to:

 Bush School (Washington), a K-12 school in Seattle, Washington, named after Helen Taylor Bush.
 Bush School of Government and Public Service, a graduate college of Texas A&M University, named after George H.W. Bush
 George Bush High School, Fort Bend County, Texas, USA
 a school for survival training

See also
 Bush (disambiguation)